The 2015 World Youth Championships in Athletics was the ninth edition of the biennial international athletics competition for youth (under-18) athletes. The five-day competition took place between 15 and 19 July at the Estadio Olímpico Pascual Guerrero stadium in Cali, Colombia. Eligible athletes were aged 16 or 17 on 31 December 2015 (born in 1998 or 1999).

Medal summary

Boys

Girls

Mixed

Medal table

References

External links
Official 2015 World Youth Championships website  at IAAF
Official website
Official statistics handbook
Results at World Athletics

 
IAAF World Youth Championships in Athletics
World Youth Championships in Athletics
World Youth Championships in Athletics
International athletics competitions hosted by Colombia
Sport in Cali
2015 in youth sport